The 2015 LFL Season was the sixth season of LFL United States, the third in the rebranded Legends Football League, and the eighth in the combined history of that league and its predecessor, the Lingerie Football League. The season featured six teams in various cities across the United States.

Developments

At the January 27th State of the League address, the League stated that four teams would be suspending operations prior to the 2015 season:The Baltimore Charm, The Green Bay Chill, the Jacksonville Breeze, and the Toledo Crush. The Green Bay Chill plan on returning from inactivity following a franchise overhaul. The Baltimore Charm plan to return for the 2016 season following a relocation to the Washington, D.C. area. Both the Jacksonville Breeze and the Toledo Crush plan to relocate to different cities in their respective states and plan to return sometime in the next few years.

Teams

Schedule

Playoffs

Standings

Eastern Conference

Western Conference

 *clinched playoff berth, ^conference champion

Legends Cup 2015

The undefeated, two-time champion Chicago Bliss faced off against the Seattle Mist who were making their first appearance in the Legends Cup.  Seattle took an early lead and built it throughout the first half, going into the break with a 20-0 lead.  Seattle added to their lead in the third quarter to go up 27-0 before Chicago began a rally.  The Bliss scored at the end of the third quarter and added two more touchdowns in the fourth quarter but fell short of victory as Seattle won its first Legends Cup title 27-21.

Awards
League MVP
 Danika Brace - Seattle Mist
 Dakota Hughes - Atlanta Steam
 K.K Matheny - Seattle Mist
 Lauran Ziegler - Atlanta Steam

Offensive Player of the Year
 Chrisdell Harris - Chicago Bliss
 Dakota Hughes - Atlanta Steam
 Stevi Schnoor - Seattle Mist
 Lauran Ziegler - Atlanta Steam

Defensive Player of the Year
 Alli Alberts - Chicago Bliss
 Danika Brace - Seattle Mist
 Leanne Hardin - Atlanta Steam
 Adrian Purnell - Atlanta Steam

Rookie of the Year
 Kimm Chase - Los Angeles Temptation
 Kadi Findling - Seattle Mist
 Jesse Locklear - Atlanta Steam
 Dominique Malloy - Las Vegas Sin

In The Trenches
 Kimm Chase - Los Angeles Temptation
 Meghan Hanson - Seattle Mist
 Yashi Rice - Chicago Bliss
 Dina Wojowski - Atlanta Steam

Mortaza Award
 Monique Gaxiola - Los Angeles Temptation
 Danielle Harvey - Los Angeles Temptation
 Amanda Hogan - Omaha Heart
 Lauran Ziegler - Atlanta Steam

Coach of the Year
 David Bizub / Tui Suiaunoa - Los Angeles Temptation
 Keith Hac - Chicago Bliss
 Chris Michaelson - Seattle Mist
 Dane Robinson - Atlanta Steam

Team of the Year
 Atlanta Steam
 Chicago Bliss
 Los Angeles Temptation
 Seattle Mist

8th Man Award (Best Fan Base)
 Atlanta Steam
 Chicago Bliss
 Omaha Heart
 Seattle Mist

2015 LFL Hall of Fame Induction
- Liz Gorman
 2009-2012 Tampa Breeze
 2013–Present Los Angeles Temptation
 2010, 2011 Defensive Player of the Year (Tampa Breeze)
 2010, 2011 Eastern Conference All-Fantasy Team (Tampa Breeze)

References

Lingerie Football League
Legends Football League